Brown Boy 2, also known as Good Intentions (Brown Boy 2 Deluxe Version), is a reissued studio album by Canadian rapper Nav. It was released on May 11, 2020, as the deluxe edition of his third studio album, Good Intentions, which was released three days prior, on May 8, 2020. The album also serves as the sequel to Nav's unofficial 2019 extended play, Brown Boy, that his manager Cash released on Audiomack to help Nav come out of retirement at the time. It features additional guest appearances from Quavo and Lil Duke. The original album features guest appearances from Young Thug, Future, Gunna, Travis Scott, Lil Uzi Vert, the late Pop Smoke, Don Toliver, and Lil Durk.
 
The deluxe edition contributed to Good Intentions debuting at number one on the Billboard 200. The relatively short span of time between the release dates of the re-issue and the standard edition of Good Intentions was a subject of controversy, with journalists viewing the back-to-back releases as being a form of chart manipulation.

Background
On March 14, 2019, Nav released the EP Brown Boy on SoundCloud. The project's tracks later went on to be included on the deluxe edition of Nav's second studio album Bad Habits. Shortly after the release of Good Intentions, Nav announced a deluxe edition release of the album titled Brown Boy 2, which he described as containing "some snippets, some leaks and some new vibes" on social media. The release of the re-issue occurred on May 11, 2020, a few days after the release of the standard edition of Good Intentions. The title comes from Nav's nickname, the Brown Boy, an ode to his Indian descent as both his parents were born in the state of Punjab in India; he has released a song of the same name as the nickname to SoundCloud sometime in 2014, and then a different song of the same name, as part of Good Intentions.

Track listing
Credits adapted from Tidal, and Nav's Instagram for the deluxe edition.

Credits adapted from Tidal.

 
Notes
  signifies a co-producer
  signifies an additional producer
  signifies an uncredited co-producer
 "Bag" contains additional vocals by Corbin

Notes

References

 

 

2020 albums
Nav (rapper) albums
Republic Records albums
Albums produced by Nav (rapper)
Albums produced by JetsonMade
Albums produced by Tay Keith
Albums produced by Wheezy
Sequel albums